Naltalimide (INN) (code name TRK-130, formerly TAK 363) is a novel, centrally-acting opioid drug which is under development by Takeda and Toray for the treatment of overactive bladder/urinary incontinence. It acts as a potent and selective partial agonist of the μ-opioid receptor (Ki = 0.268 nM, EC50 = 2.39 nM, Emax = 66.1%) over the δ-opioid (Ki = 121 nM, EC50 = 26.1 nM, Emax = 71.0%) and κ-opioid receptors (Ki = 8.97 nM, EC50 = 9.51 nM, Emax = 62.6%). Notably, naltalimide somehow appears to lack certain undesirable side effects such as constipation seen with other μ-opioid receptor agonists such as morphine. It enhances bladder storage via suppression of the afferent limb of the micturition reflex pathway.

References 

4,5-Epoxymorphinans
Mu-opioid receptor agonists
Phthalimides
Takeda Pharmaceutical Company brands

Toray Industries